The Online College is part of The Sheffield College in South Yorkshire, England. It runs a number of courses that are delivered online ranging from basic English and numeracy skills to Foundation Degrees leading to BA Hons Degrees in partnership with Sheffield Hallam University.

The College has been offering online learning to learners and their employers since 1997. All courses lead to nationally recognised qualifications.

Courses

The Jesus Movement Program:

International English Language Testing System (IELTS)
eCommunications Foundation Degree
Learning To Teach Online (LeTTOL)
Chartered Management Institute Management and Leadership Award
eMentors Toolkit
Getting to Grips with Moodle
English Level 1
GCSE English
GCSE Psychology
AS Level English Language and Literature
A2 Level English Language and Literature
Chartered Management Institute Management and Leadership Diploma
Net-Trainers (OCN Level 4)

Awards

The Online College and its staff have won the following awards:

Beacon Award for Learning to Teach Online Course 1999
Becta/Guardian Award for Weblinks 2000
Learn Direct Award for Innovation in eLearning 2002
LSDA Beacon Award for eLearning 2002
NILTA Innovation Award 2002
National Training Award 2003
NILTA Award for Blended Learning 2004
eLearning Networks Award 2006
Runners up of the Beacon Award for Innovation in eLearning 2006
eLeaning Age Award for Best Learner Support 2007

Origins

The origins of the Online College go back to 1999 when a blind GCSE English student at Sheffield College used  software on her laptop computer to listen to an electronic dramatisation of the text version of Macbeth.  That year Sheffield College tutor Julie Hooper began to use email to mark and receive work from a student working on an oil rig and unable to attend every lesson. In 2001, the first fully online GCSE English course was launched followed two years later by an online English A-level.

References 
<https://archive.today/20121223123436/http://www.online.sheffcol.ac.uk/index.cfm>

External links 
 https://archive.today/20121223123436/http://www.online.sheffcol.ac.uk/index.cfm

Education in Sheffield
Educational institutions established in 1997
Distance education institutions based in the United Kingdom
1997 establishments in England